Lakhan Singh is an Indian politician and a member of 17th Legislative Assembly, Uttar Pradesh of India. He represents the ‘Dibiyapur’ constituency in Auraiya district of Uttar Pradesh.

Political career
Lakhan Singh contested Uttar Pradesh Assembly Election as Bharatiya Janata Party candidate and defeated his close contestant Pradeep KumarYadav from Samajwadi Party with a margin of 12,094 votes.

He has been appointed as Minister of state in a Yogi Adityanath cabinet on 21 August 2019.

Posts held

References

Year of birth missing (living people)
Living people
Bharatiya Janata Party politicians from Uttar Pradesh
Uttar Pradesh MLAs 2017–2022